Oedong station is a railway station in Oedong-ri, Kaech'ŏn county, South P'yŏngan province, North Korea, on the Taegŏn Line of the Korean State Railway.

References

Railway stations in North Korea